Metromix LLC was a Chicago entertainment website at Chicago.Metromix.com, owned by the Chicago Tribune division of Tribune Publishing.  It served the Chicago metropolitan area. The website now redirects to that of the Chicago Tribune.

History
Originally launched in 1996 as metromix.com by the Chicago Tribune, it was a local Chicago website targeting young, socially active adults looking for an insider’s perspective on local trends and hotspots. Users were typically 21 to 34 years of age with significant disposable income and highly active social lives. It earned various awards including the EPpy Award for Best Entertainment Site and the Digital Edge Award for Best Advertising Program.

In 2007, Metromix became a joint venture between the media conglomerates Gannett Company and former Tribune Company.

A guide to local restaurants, bars and clubs, events, concerts and movies, Metromix became available in over 60 markets. In late 2009, the company launched 27 new sites to complete their presence in the top 50 DMAs.

The company introduced Metromix Deals, a suite of new features on its websites that showcase deals and specials to its visitors who use the sites to plan nights out in their cities.

Metromix also operated mobile sites, an iPhone app and in several markets, a Metromix-branded print publication or section within another publication, e.g., in RedEye in Chicago.

In October 2010, Metromix launched a new section to their site which offered aggregated deals in each respective market.

In 2012, Gannett and Tribune ended the Metromix partnership. Metromix no longer offers a national presence and all references to cities besides Chicago were removed.

Present day
In 2014 Metromix was spun off with the Chicago Tribune as part of the new Tribune Publishing group. 

The former Metromix.com website is now located at Chicago.Metromix.com.

References

External links
 Chicago.Metromix.com: Official Metromix website.

Mass media in Chicago
American review websites
Online companies of the United States
Chicago Tribune
Companies based in Chicago
Internet properties established in 1996
1996 establishments in Illinois
Gannett
Tribune Publishing